Galuninskaya is a rural locality (a village) in Mityukovskoye Rural Settlement, Vozhegodsky District, Vologda Oblast, Russia. The population was 22 as of 2002.

Geography 
Galuninskaya is located 65 km southeast of Vozhega (the district's administrative centre) by road. Galuninskaya is the nearest rural locality.

References 

Rural localities in Vozhegodsky District